Peter Newsome (born February 1943 in London, UK) is a modern-day glass sculptor.

Selected exhibitions

Art Fair London, Burton’s Court, Chelsea & Business Design Centre, Islington.
Bow House Gallery, Barnet, Herts.
Centenary Exhibition of Royal British Society of Sculptors, Botanical Gdns, Leicester
Chelsea Flower Show, London
Chelsea Open, Chelsea Old Town Hall, London
Cynthia Corbett Gallery, Wimbledon, Surrey
Dignon Gallery, Dundas St, Edinburgh
Dfn Gallery, Broadway, Manhattan, New York, USA
Edith Grove Gallery, Fulham London
ERCO Dover St. London, W1
Goldsmiths Fair, Goldsmiths Hall, London
Guernsey International Sculpture Exhibition, Channel Islands
Hay’s Gallery, London SE1
Hampton Court Flower Show, Hampton Court, Middx
Henley Festival, Towpath Gallery, Henley on Thames, Oxon.
Mall Galleries, The Mall, London.
Newby Hall Sculpture Park, Yorkshire.
Nymans Garden (National Trust) Sussex
OXO Tower, South Bank, London
Royal Horticultural Garden Wisley, Surrey
Royal British Society of Sculptors, Kensington, London

References

External links

 Newsome's official website

1943 births
Living people
Artists from London
British sculptors
British male sculptors
British glass artists